Asterolasia pallida is a species of woody, perennial herb that is endemic to the southwest of Western Australia. It has elliptical leaves and white flowers arranged in umbels of three to six with star-shaped hairs on the back of the petals and fifteen to twenty-five stamens.

Description

Taxonomy
Asterolasia pallida was first formally described in 1863 by George Bentham and the description was published in Flora Australiensis from specimens collected by James Drummond.

In 1998, Paul Wilson described two subspecies and the names are accepted by the Australian Plant Census:
 Asterolasia pallida subsp. hyalina has petals with only colourless hairs on the back of the petals and only occurs in the Dryandra State Forest south-east of Perth;
 Asterolasia pallida subsp. pallida has both colourless and reddish hairs on the back of the petals and has a widespread distribution on the Darling Range.

Distribution and habitat
This species grows on laterite in jarrah - marri woodland on the Darling Range from near Perth to Manjimup. Subspecies hyalina is restricted to the Dryandra State Forest.

Conservation status
Asterolasia pallida is classified as "not threatened" by the Government of Western Australia Department of Parks and Wildlife.

References

pallida
Rosids of Western Australia
Plants described in 1863
Taxa named by George Bentham